Theory and Research in Education is a triannual peer-reviewed academic journal that covers field of education. The editor-in-chief is Randall Curren (University of Rochester). It was established in 2003 and is published by SAGE Publications in association with The Slovene Society of Researchers in the School Field.

Abstracting and indexing 
The journal is abstracted and indexed International Bibliography of the Social Sciences, Scopus, and Sociological Abstracts.

External links 
 

SAGE Publishing academic journals
English-language journals
Education journals
Publications established in 2003
Triannual journals